Quảng Ngãi Football Club is a football club, based in Quảng Ngãi Province, Vietnam, that has been dissolved and withdrawn from any league in VFF (assembled in 1990, dissolution in 2012, reassembled in 2017 and dissolution six years later).

Demotion to 2009 First Division season
The VFF's disciplinary board suspended Quảng Ngãi from the First Division and slapped a fine of VND70 million (US$3,950). The central province-based team have to play in the Second Division next season. The incident happened when referee Kieu Viet Hung awarded a penalty to Saigon United F.C, following an illegal tackle by Quảng Ngãi defender Vu Quang Vinh in the 80th minute. The Quảng Ngãi players suddenly walked out in the 80th minute to show their reactive attitude to the referee after receiving a penalty kick at HCMC's Thống Nhất Stadium when hosts Saigon United were leading 2–1. With Quãng Ngãi FC left the game from the 70th minute to protest the action of the referee, despite being threatened by match overwatch; Quang Ngai FC had to face a penalty: removed from the 2009 First Division season and fined VND70 million. Vu Quang Vinh, the player that made the illegal tackle and pushed the referee away afterwards, is fined VND 10 million (US$425) and banned from every game held by VFF until 30 April 2010. Deputy Head of Quảng Ngãi FC Mr Hồ Đăng Bồng and assistant coach Mr Trịnh Công Minh were fined VND 10 million and banned from every activity held by the VPF within 18 months.

Achievements

National competitions
League
Second League:
 Winners :  2006

References
 http://english.thesaigontimes.vn/Home/sports/home/5715/
 http://www.saigon-gpdaily.com.vn/Sport/2009/7/72866/

Football clubs in Vietnam